St. Paul's Episcopal Church and Cemetery is a historic church on Cowles Street between Woodland Boulevard and West Street in Wilkesboro, North Carolina. It was added to the National Register of Historic Places in 1982 as a Historic Place in Wilkes County, North Carolina.

St. Paul's was built in 1848 and is the most important example of the Gothic Revival style in Wilkesboro as well as being a typical example of many American Episcopal churches built during the mid nineteenth century. A small brick structure, the church incorporates many Gothic features which bear similarity with those of English medieval parish churches; these include a steep gable roof, corner buttresses, lancet arched windows and doors, and plentiful Gothic interior detailing.

References

External links
Church website

Episcopal church buildings in North Carolina
Cemeteries in North Carolina
Anglican cemeteries in the United States
Churches on the National Register of Historic Places in North Carolina
Gothic Revival church buildings in North Carolina
Churches completed in 1848
19th-century Episcopal church buildings
Churches in Wilkes County, North Carolina
National Register of Historic Places in Wilkes County, North Carolina